Resnick is a Yiddish surname, a variant of Reznik. People with the surname include:

 Adam Resnick, American comedy writer
 Alice Robie Resnick (born 1939), Ohio Supreme Court Justice
 Artie Resnick (born 1937), American songwriter and record producer
 David Resnick (1924–2012), Israeli architect
 Faye Resnick (born 1957), American television personality and interior designer
 Joseph Y. Resnick (1924–1969), member of the US House of Representatives from New York
 Josh Resnick, American video game producer
 Ken Resnick, American wrestling announcer
 Laura Resnick (born 1962), science fiction and fantasy author
 Lauren Resnick, American educational psychologist
 Lynda Resnick (born 1944), American entrepreneur and businesswoman
 Mike Resnick (1942–2020), American science fiction author
 Milton Resnick (1917–2004), American abstract expressionist painter
 Mitchel Resnick (born 1956), American computer scientist and academic
 Randy Resnick (born 1947), American guitarist
 Robert Resnick (1923–2014), American physicist and textbook author
 Robert J. Resnick (1940–2022), American psychotherapist and psychologist
 Stephen Resnick (born 1938), American Marxian economist
 Stewart Resnick (born 1938), American businessman 
 Zvi Yosef Resnick (1841–1912), Russian rabbi, scholar, and rosh yeshivah
 Mnachem Risikoff (born Mnachem Resnick), Russian and American rabbi and scholar

Fictional characters:
 Charlie Resnick, a detective inspector created by John Harvey

See also
 Resnik (surname)
 Reznick